There have been two baronetcies created for members of the Ripley family, both in the Baronetage of the United Kingdom. One creation is extant as of 2007.

The Ripley Baronetcy, of Rawdon in the County of York, and Bedstone, Shropshire was created in the Baronetage of the United Kingdom on 8 May 1880 for the businessman and Liberal politician Henry Ripley. He was succeeded by his eldest son Edward, who was High Sheriff of Shropshire in 1891. This baronetcy is extant. The family seat is Bedstone House, Shropshire.

The Ripley Baronetcy, of 'Acacia', Rawdon, in the County of York, was created in the Baronetage of the United Kingdom on 4 September 1897 for Frederick Ripley. He was the third son of the first Baronet of the 1880 creation. The title became extinct on the death of the third Baronet in 1954.

Ripley baronets, of Rawdon (1880)
Sir Henry William Ripley, 1st Baronet (1813–1882)
Sir Edward Ripley, 2nd Baronet (1840–1903)
Sir Henry William Alfred Ripley, 3rd Baronet (1879–1956)
Sir Hugh Ripley, 4th Baronet (1916–2003)
Sir William Hugh Ripley, 5th Baronet (born 1950)

There is no heir to the baronetcy.

Ripley baronets, of Acacia (1897)
Sir Frederick Ripley, 1st Baronet (1846–1907)
Sir Frederick Hugh Ripley, 2nd Baronet (1878–1945)
Sir Geoffrey Arnold Ripley, 3rd Baronet (1883–1954)

References
Ripley papers: National Archives, West Yorkshire Archive Service, Wakefield. Reference C325.
Kidd, Charles, Williamson, David (editors). Debrett's Peerage and Baronetage (1990 edition). New York: St Martin's Press, 1990.

Baronetcies in the Baronetage of the United Kingdom
Extinct baronetcies in the Baronetage of the United Kingdom